The Bare Top Range is a small subrange of the Kitimat Ranges, running along the east side of Grenville Channel on the north side of Lowe Inlet in British Columbia, Canada.

References

Kitimat Ranges